A. Mathias Mundadan, C.M.I. of Alangad was a priest of the Carmelites of Mary Immaculate in the Syro-Malabar Church. He was born on 12 November 1923 and died on 31 August 2012. He was appointed Rector of Dharmaram Vidya Kshetram on 22 April 1975 and continued till 1981. He was also a historian of the Church and has authored a number of books.

References 

 Church History Association of India
 A. Mathias Mundadan / The St. Thomas Christian Encyclopaedia of India

1923 births
2012 deaths
People from Ernakulam district
Malayali people
Syro-Malabar priests
Secular Order of Discalced Carmelites